Eugenia mooniana, is a species of plant in the family Myrtaceae which is native to Western Ghats of India and Sri Lanka.

Leaves are simple, opposite; lamina elliptic to narrow elliptic; apex caudate-acuminate with blunt tip; base acute to rounded with entire margin. Flowers are white colored. Fruit is a globose, glabrous, single-seeded berry. Flowering starts from October and ends in December.

References

Notes on Eugenia gracilis, Eugenia mooniana and Eugenia phillyreoides (Myrtaceae)

mooniana
Flora of the Indian subcontinent